The term information scientist developed in the latter part of the twentieth century to describe an individual, usually with a relevant subject degree (such as one in Information and Computer Science - CIS) or high level of subject knowledge, providing focused information to scientific and technical research staff in industry. It is a role quite distinct from and complementary to that of a librarian. Developments in end-user searching, together with some convergence between the roles of librarian and information scientist, have led to a diminution in its use in this context, and the term information officer or information professional (information specialist) are also now used.

The term was, and is, also used for an individual carrying out research in information science.

Brian C. Vickery mentions that the Institute of Information Scientists (IIS) was established in London during 1958 and lists the criteria put forward by this institute "Criteria for Information Science" (appendix 1) as well as his own "Areas of study in information science" (appendix 2). The IIS merged with the Library Association in 2002 to form the Chartered Institute of Library and Information Professionals (CILIP).

Examples
 Marcia Bates
 David Blair (information technologist)
 Samuel C. Bradford
 Michael Buckland
 John M. Carroll
 Blaise Cronin
 Emilia Currás
 Eugene Garfield
 Paul B. Kantor
 Frederick Wilfrid Lancaster
 Calvin Mooers
 Robert Saxton Taylor
 Brian Campbell Vickery
 Thomas D. Wilson

See also
Computer scientist
Documentalist
Information history
 Information science
 Library and information scientist
Library scholar

References
 Vickery, B. & Vickery, A.  (1987) Information Science in theory and practice (London: Bowker-Saur, pp. 361–369)
Ellis, David and Merete Haugan. (1997) "Modelling the information seeking patterns of engineers and research scientists in an industrial environment" (Journal of Documentation, Volume 53(4): pp. 384–403)
Vickery, Brian Campbell (1988) "Essays presented to B. C. Vickery"  (Journal of Documentation, Volume 44, pp. 199–283)

External links
"Pioneers" of Information Science scrapbook: https://web.archive.org/web/20140201230801/http://faculty.libsci.sc.edu/bob/ISP/scrapbook.htm
scientists information

.
Information science

da:Informationsforsker